Lessons Learned is the sixth studio album by American country music artist Tracy Lawrence. It was also his last album for Atlantic Records before the closure of Atlantic's Nashville division in 2000. This album produced three singles for Lawrence between 2000 and 2001: the title track, "Lonely", and "Unforgiven", which peaked at #3, #18, and #35, respectively, on the Billboard country singles charts. "Lessons Learned" was also Lawrence's first Top Ten country hit since "How a Cowgirl Says Goodbye" in 1997.

Track listing

Personnel
As listed in liner notes
Sonny Garrish - steel guitar, lap steel guitar
Jack Gavin - drums, percussion
Rob Hajacos - fiddle
Tony Harrell - keyboards
Rick Huckaby - acoustic guitar, background vocals
Tracy Lawrence - lead vocals
B. James Lowry - acoustic guitar
Gary Lunn - bass guitar
Liana Manis - background vocals
Brent Rowan - electric guitar, acoustic guitar
Joe Spivey - fiddle, mandolin
John Willis - acoustic guitar, mandolin

Strings on "Just You and Me", "From Here to Kingdom Come" and "Unforgiven" arranged by Kristin Wilkinson and performed by her, David Davidson, David Angell and John Catchings

Chart performance

References

2000 albums
Atlantic Records albums
Tracy Lawrence albums